An Thuong is a commune in the district of Hoài Đức, Hanoi, Vietnam. The chairman of this commune is Lê Văn Vinh. The commune has an area of 6 km², population in 2008 was 6,600 with a density of 1,100/km².

The overwhelming ethnic group is the Kinh people.

Geography
An Thượng borders following communes:

Song Phương to the north 
Vân Côn to the west 
To the south it borders:Đông La (of Hoài Đức); Tân Phú, Đại Thành (of Quốc Oai)
An Khánh to the east

Communes of Hanoi
Populated places in Hanoi